Coleophora kitella is a moth of the family Coleophoridae.

References

kitella
Moths described in 1994